Lindsay Davenport was the defending champion, but chose not to participate that year due to her pregnancy.

Elena Dementieva won in the final 6–4, 6–1, against Elena Vesnina.

Seeds

Draw

Finals

Top half

Bottom half

External links
Draw

WTA Auckland Open
2009 WTA Tour